11118 Modra, provisional designation , is a Flora asteroid of uncertain composition from the inner regions of the asteroid belt, approximately 5 kilometers in diameter.

It was discovered on 9 August 1996, by Slovak astronomers Adrián Galád and Dušan Kalmančok at the Modra Observatory in Slovakia, and named for the town Modra where the discovering observatory is located.

Classification and orbit 

Modra is a member of the Flora family, one of the largest families of stony asteroids. It orbits the Sun in the inner main-belt at a distance of 2.1–2.5 AU once every 3 years and 6 months (1,286 days). Its orbit has an eccentricity of 0.08 and an inclination of 3° with respect to the ecliptic. A first precovery was taken at ESO's La Silla Observatory in 1991, extending the asteroid's observation arc by 5 years prior to its discovery.

Rotation period 

In September 2010, a photometric lightcurve analysis of Modra by American astronomer Brian Warner at his Palmer Divide Observatory, Colorado, rendered an unambiguous period of  hours with a brightness variation of 0.53 in magnitude. A second lightcurve obtained during the wide-field survey at the U.S. Palomar Transient Factory in August 2010, and gave a period of  hours with an amplitude of 0.42.

Diameter and albedo 

According to the survey carried out by NASA's Wide-field Infrared Survey Explorer and its subsequent NEOWISE mission, the asteroid has a low albedo of 0.05. In agreement, the large-scale survey by Pan-STARRS (PS1) rates it as a dark carbonaceous body. However, the Collaborative Asteroid Lightcurve Link (CALL) assumes a much higher albedo of 0.24 – derived from 8 Flora, the orbital family's largest member and namesake – and groups it to the S-type asteroid. The different albedos of the two spectral classes also translate into divergent estimates for the body's diameter. While CALL calculates 3.7 kilometers, NASA's space-based survey inferred a much larger diameter of 8.7 kilometers.

Naming 

This minor planet was named after both the small historical town of Modra, located in the Bratislava Region of Slovakia, and the Modra Observatory of the Institute of Astronomy at Comenius University, where this asteroid had been discovered. The approved naming citation was published by the Minor Planet Center on 28 September 1999.

References

External links 
  
 Lightcurve plot of 11118 Modra, Palmer Divide Observatory, B. D. Warner (2010)
 Asteroid Lightcurve Database (LCDB), query form (info )
 Dictionary of Minor Planet Names, Google books
 Asteroids and comets rotation curves, CdR – Observatoire de Genève, Raoul Behrend
 Discovery Circumstances: Numbered Minor Planets (10001)-(15000) – Minor Planet Center
 
 

011118
Discoveries by Adrián Galád
Discoveries by Dušan Kalmančok
Named minor planets
19960809